Tau Mu Tau sorority began in the early 1900s with twelve members at Gustavus Adolphus College.  Like most sororities at Gustavus, the TMTs began as more of a college literary society and evolved eventually into having a more social focus.  During the organization's early years, members proved troublesome for then Gustavus President Peter August Mattson.  According to Doniver Lund's book Gustavus Adolphus College: A Centennial History, the women "were not only known as The Modest Tribe but also as Ten Mattson's Troubles." The current mission of Tau Mu Tau is to provide an enlightening and enjoyable experience that combines friendship and unity, and integrates the development of values with intellectual and social growth. In the fall of 2016, the sorority was suspended for violations of the college hazing policy.

Membership 
Unlike Greek groups at other colleges, Tau Mu Tau is an independent organization that is not affiliated with any national or international organization.  This is case with most Greek organizations at Gustavus.  However, the women are active in a number of organizations such as SAVE (Suicide Awareness Voices in Education).  Women who have participated in this sorority have gone on to lead lives of distinction, and a number have been included in publications such as Outstanding Young Women of America and Who's Who in the West: A Biographical Dictionary of Noteworthy Men and Women.

References

External links 
 Tau Mu Tau's webpage
 Gustavus Adolphus College Archives

Fraternities and sororities in the United States